Singe was a Renard-class xebec of the French Navy, launched in 1762. She served in the Mediterranean against the Barbary pirates, and is notable for a number of important officers who served aboard, notably Flotte, Raimondis and Suffren.

Career 
In 1763, Singe patrolled the Mediterranean with her sister-ship Caméléon and the frigate Pléïade, to ward off the Salé Rovers. On 15 July 1763, Singe mistakenly engaged a galiot from Algiers, which she mistook for a Salé rover. Pléïade intervened fired two broadsides into the galiot, which sank with all hands before the error was realised. This triggered a diplomatic incident and Captain Fabry had to negotiate a resolution to the crisis. 

In 1763, Singe was under Suffren, part of a squadron under Duchaffault. She took part in the Larache expedition in June 1765. 

In 1769, Singe off Porto-Vecchio under Raimondis.

Fate
Singe was sold in Toulon in 1780.

Legacy 
A 1/28.8 scale model of Singe is on display at the Musée national de la Marine in Paris.

Sources and references 
 Notes

References

 Bibliography
 
 
 
 
  (1671-1870)
 

External links
 

1762 ships
Age of Sail corvettes of France
Ships built in France